Key of a Minor is the debut album of American singer-songwriter Jessica Riddle, released in 2000.

"Even Angels Fall"  was featured in the 1999 movie 10 Things I Hate about You and on its soundtrack.

Track listing 
All songs by Jessica Riddle unless otherwise noted.
"I Want You" (Riddle, Kim Bullard) – 3:54
"Sadly Beautiful" (Paul Westerberg) – 3:07
"Symphony" (Riddle, Joseph Broussard, Carrol Washington, Ralph G. Williams) – 3:54
"Even Angels Fall" (Riddle, Bullard, Tom Whitlock, Penny Framstad) – 3:26
"I'm Sorry" – 4:44
"Your Girl" – 2:53
"Everything" (Riddle, Bullard) – 4:16
"For Wowser" – 4:02
"Indifference" (Riddle, Bullard)" – 4:33
"Dreams Will Fade" – 3:20
"Gone" – 2:40

Personnel
Jessica Riddle – vocals
Rusty Anderson – guitar
Joseph Bishara – loops
Curt Bisquera – drums, percussion
Chris Bruce – bass
Matt Chamberlain – drums
Davey Faragher – bass
Steve Farris – guitar
Stuart Mathis – guitar
Jamie Muhoberac – keyboards
John Pierce – bass
Tim Pierce – guitar
Michael Ward – guitar

References 

2000 debut albums
Jessica Riddle albums